Janice Renée Torre (August 17, 1914 – February 21, 1985) was a songwriter and lyricist best known for the song "Paper Roses", which she wrote with composer Fred Spielman.

Early years
Janice Torre was born in New Orleans, the daughter of Peter Torre, an Italian immigrant developer in the oil industry, and Juanita Mottram. Janice graduated from Academy of the Sacred Heart (New Orleans), H. Sophie Newcomb Memorial College of Tulane University, where she was president of her Senior Class, and Yale School of Drama. At Newcomb she was a member of Alpha Omicron Pi.

Musical career
Janice Torre collaborated with the composer Fred Spielman. Torre wrote song lyrics for the films All Shook Up with Elvis Presley, Tom Thumb, Luxury Liner with Lauritz Melchior, In the Good Old Summertime with Judy Garland, Big City, and Girls! Girls! Girls! (1962) with Elvis Presley. Torre and Spielman wrote the television musical adaptation of Charles Dickens's A Christmas Carol, titled The Stingiest Man In Town (1956).

Personal and later years
Janice Torre was married to Gregory Manning Perky, a science teacher at the Isidore Newman School in New Orleans. She composed her last film score in 1962. She died in New York City and is interred in Metairie Cemetery, New Orleans.

References

1914 births
1985 deaths
American film score composers
American women film score composers
American musical theatre composers
Women musical theatre composers
Songwriters from Louisiana
American musical theatre librettists
American musical theatre lyricists
20th-century American dramatists and playwrights
Writers from New Orleans
Musicians from New Orleans
H. Sophie Newcomb Memorial College alumni
Schools of the Sacred Heart alumni
Yale School of Drama alumni
American women composers
American writers of Italian descent
20th-century American women musicians
20th-century American composers
20th-century women composers
Burials at Metairie Cemetery